Tonyosynthemis is a genus of slender black and yellow dragonflies in the family Synthemistidae.
It is endemic to eastern Australia.

Species
The genus contains only two species:
 Tonyosynthemis claviculata  - clavicle tigertail
 Tonyosynthemis ofarrelli  - slender tigertail

See also
 List of Odonata species of Australia

References

 

Synthemistidae
Anisoptera genera
Odonata of Australia
Endemic fauna of Australia
Taxa named by Günther Theischinger
Insects described in 1998